Jia Chunwang (born May 1938) is a Chinese politician, intelligence officer, and prosecutor who held top positions in both the security apparatus and judiciary of the People's Republic of China. He served as Minister of State Security for 13  years (1985–1998), as Minister of Public Security (1998–2002) and finally as Procurator–General of the Supreme People's Procuratorate (2003–2008), a post roughly equivalent to Attorney General in the United States or Prosecutor General in Russia.

The longest-serving Minister of State Security to date, he is also regarded as the most influential, greatly expanding the size, budget and capabilities of the MSS during a pivotal time, which saw tactical collaboration with the American Central Intelligence Agency in arming, training and funding Afghan guerrillas against the Soviets, the 1989 Tiananmen Square protests and massacre, the end of the Cold War and the subsequent establishment of good relations with Russia, and the handover of Hong Kong from British to Chinese control.

Biography
Jia, a native of Beijing, was born in May 1938 and studied at Tsinghua University, graduating with a degree in nuclear physics. He joined the Chinese Communist Party in 1962, and in 1964 he began teaching physics at Tsinghua University, while at the same time being active in the Communist Party branch within the university, called being a "double-load cadre". In some foreign newspaper articles during the 1980s and 1990s, he was incorrectly referred to as an engineer; for example, in 1991 the New York Times described him thus: "the nation's spymaster, Jia Chunwang, who is Minister of State Security, is a 53-year-old English-speaking engineer". This confusion derived from the fact that the Tsinghua faculty from which Jia graduated was called the "Department of Engineering Physics", although Jia actually completed the nuclear physics program.

In 1966, at the start of the Cultural Revolution, he was attacked and beaten up by Red Guards, dismissed from the university, and sent to work in rural farms. In 1972 he returned to Tsinghua and became a professor of physics, as well as secretary of the university's Communist Youth League. In 1983 Jia was one of the young officials chosen for senior positions when Deng sidelined older cadre. His prospects improved when he became an acolyte of vice premier Qiao Shi. He steadily rose within the Communist Party and was eventually named Party Secretary of Beijing's Haidian District. In 1984, he became Secretary of the Beijing branch of the powerful Central Commission for Discipline Inspection, the Party's internal watchdog.

In 1985 he was appointed Minister of State Security, thus overseeing China's most important intelligence and security agency, responsible for foreign intelligence, counter-intelligence and regime protection. He remained on this post for 13 years, until 1998, the longest tenure in the Ministry's history so far. In 1998 he was moved to the Ministry of Public Security (supervising regular police and security forces) where he remained until 2002, while also being named Political Commissar of the People's Armed Police.

Finally, he served as Deputy Procurator–General (2002–2003) and Procurator–General (2003–2008) of the Supreme People's Procuratorate, thus being China's highest-ranked prosecutor. In 2006, he was elected President of the International Association of Anti-Corruption Authorities.

Jia was described as low-key and self-effacing; his wife, Yu Jingzhi, is also a professor at Tsinghua University.

Jia Chunwang was a member of the 13th, 14th, 15th, and 16th Communist Party Central Committees, from 1987 to 2007.

Afghanistan
As Minister of State Security, Jia Chunwang continued and expanded the close collaboration with the American CIA and with Pakistan in training Afghan guerrillas against the Soviets. Beginning in February 1980, Chinese intelligence, led at the time by Luo Qingchang, had started offering small arms and financial support to Afghan resistance groups. From 1980 to 1984 the cost of Chinese support totaled approximately $400 million. When Jia Chunwang became head of the MSS, support expanded to include heavy machine guns, mortars, recoilless rifles, rocket launchers and anti-aircraft artillery; the MSS, in collaboration with the Intelligence Bureau of the PLA General Staff, provided these weapons to a number of Afghan resistance groups established by the Chinese themselves, including "Victory", "Guards", "Immortal Flame" and "Paikar". The Afghans were trained in two networks of secret military camps, both in Xinjiang; one network of camps was in the vicinity of Kashgar, the other in the vicinity of Hotan. Hundreds of Chinese advisers also worked in Pakistani training camps, along the Afghanistan-Pakistan border.

Tiananmen crackdown and expulsion of George Soros foundations
As Minister of State Security, Jia Chunwang played a major role in expelling from China all foundations and organizations funded by, or collaborating with, Hungarian-American billionaire George Soros. Soros began working in China in spring 1986, by funding research for strengthening China's reform and opening up. Then, in October 1986, Soros collaborated with Li Xianglu of the "Association of Young Chinese Economists" to establish a Beijing office for his foundations, and Zhao Ziyang (then Premier) approved. Soon thereafter Soros sent a message that he was interested in establishing personal relations with senior Communist Party leaders to exchange views on problems of economic reform in China. By May 1989 Soros had spent millions of dollars in China, working in four areas: travel expenses for Chinese scholars to visit the United States, the purchase of Western books on the social sciences for Chinese universities, establishment of political reform associations, and certain cultural activities.

Jia Chunwang and the MSS were closely watching the activities of Soros the whole time, and in fact, the head of the Beijing office that Soros established was actually an MSS agent posing as an economic reformer. On 23 May 1989 (just before the 1989 Tiananmen Square crackdown) all Soros-related foundations and organizations were forcibly dissolved and shut down, and Soros himself was warned that "he was not welcome" in China anymore. Soros was allowed to visit China again only 12 years later, in 2001.

Jia was also instrumental in the actual crackdown and military suppression of the Tiananmen protests. On 1 June 1989, three days before the massacre, an MSS report written mostly by Jia himself and titled "On ideological and political infiltration into our country from the United States and other international political forces", was delivered to every single member of the Politburo, and to senior Party elders, including Deng Xiaoping, Li Xiannian and Chen Yun, advocating for immediate military action and placing responsibility for the protests and the turmoil on foreign, hostile Western forces:

References

External links 
 http://english.peopledaily.com.cn/data/people/jiachunwang.shtml
 http://english.people.com.cn/200303/16/eng20030316_113376.shtml

1938 births
Living people
People's Republic of China politicians from Beijing
Tsinghua University alumni
Ministers of State Security of the People's Republic of China
Ministers of Public Security of the People's Republic of China
Procurator-General of the Supreme People's Procuratorate